São Marcos da Ataboeira is a Portuguese town/parish in the municipality of Castro Verde. The population in 2011 was 338, in an area of 104.13 km2. The village was integrated into the municipality of Castro Verde during the nineteenth century, and is situated 13 km north east from the municipal seat.

It is a territory where the pseudo-steppe is predominant, and grazing has an important role in preserving the traditional landscape. The area of the parish belongs to the SPA - Special Protection Area, for endangered species of steppe birds such as the great bustard and lesser kestrel. The SPA makes part of the Natura 2000 project of the European Union.

A few kilometres from the nearby town of Salto sits the chapel of 'Our Lady of Aracelis', a place of pilgrimage and festivities during the first weekend of September.

Photos

References

História e histórias-Castro Verde, Joaquim Boiça/Rui Mateus, Artinvento, Região de Turismo da Planicie Dourada/Câmara Municipal de Castro Verde;

External links
Town Hall official website- (Portuguese: Use Google Translate to convert to other languages)
 List of birds of Portugal

Freguesias of Castro Verde